The State of Colorado was represented in the United States House of Representatives by one member of the House, elected at-large from 1876 until 1893 and from 1903 until 1913, and by two members at-large from 1913 until 1915. Since the 1914 elections, all members from Colorado have been elected from congressional districts.

1876-1893
Colorado was represented by only one member of the House, elected at-large state-wide, from its admission as a state until 1893.

Colorado was granted a second seat in the U.S. House of Representatives beginning with the U.S. election of 1892.

1903-1915
Colorado was apportioned a third seat in the U.S. House of Representatives beginning with the 1902 elections. Colorado's third member of the House was elected at-large. Colorado was apportioned a fourth seat in beginning with the 1912 elections.

Colorado used four congressional districts beginning with the U.S. elections of 1914.

See also
Colorado Territory's at-large congressional district
Colorado's congressional districts
List of United States representatives from Colorado
United States congressional delegations from Colorado

References

 Congressional Biographical Directory of the United States 1774–present

External links
Biographical Directory of the United States Congress

At-Large
Former congressional districts of the United States
At-large United States congressional districts